Vandalize is the 3rd studio album from visual kei rock band Alice Nine. It was released on January 19, 2009.
The album contains eleven tracks, compiling the band's three previous singles ("Mirror Ball", "Rainbows", and "Cross Game") and eight new songs. The album was released in two versions: a regular edition, and a limited edition of the album, which includes a DVD that features live footage, a promotional music video for "the beautiful name," and a special package design. The album debuted on the Oricon Chart with a #3 daily and a #7 weekly, with total sales of 13,111 recorded.

Track listing 
Disc one (CD)
 "the beautiful name"
 "Hyakka Ryōran" (百花繚乱; Many Flowers Blooming Profusely)
 "Rainbows"
 "Kiss twice, Kiss me deadly"
 "Cross Game"
 "Subaru" (昴; Pleiades)
 "www."
 "Drella"
 "Mirror Ball (Vandalize Edition)"
 "Innocence" (イノセンス)
 "Waterfall"

Disc two (DVD, limited edition only)
 "the beautiful name" music video
 making of "the beautiful name"
 "Tsubasa" (2008.8.31 Live at NAKANO SUNPLAZA HALL)

References

2009 albums
Alice Nine albums
Alice Nine video albums